Christina Elmore is an American actress, known for her role in the TV series The Last Ship as Lieutenant Alisha Granderson, and her roles on Twenties and HBO's Insecure.

Early life and education
Elmore was born to Dr. Ronn and Aladrian Elmore, and raised in Los Angeles and Sacramento, California. She graduated from Franklin High School and then attended Harvard University, where she received a Bachelor of Arts degree in African American studies. She began acting in theater productions as an undergraduate. In 2012, she received her Master of Fine Arts degree in acting from American Conservatory Theater.

Career 
In 2014, Elmore played a lead role in Adam Rapp's The Purple Lights of Joppa Illinois, staged by South Coast Repertory.

Elmore's first film job was a small role in the critically acclaimed film Fruitvale Station. Her first recurring role was in the action-drama series The Last Ship, where she portrayed Lt. Alisha Granderson for five seasons. Elmore guest-starred in two episodes of HBO's Insecure and returned for a recurring role on season four.

Elmore was cast in a lead role on Twenties, which premiered on BET in 2020.

Personal life 
Elmore is married to Ryan Duke. As of September 2020, she is pregnant with their second child.

Filmography

Film

Television

References

External links 
 

Year of birth missing (living people)
Living people
African-American actresses
American stage actresses
Harvard College alumni
21st-century American actresses
Actresses from Sacramento, California
Actresses from Los Angeles
21st-century African-American women
21st-century African-American people